Turgutlu railway station is a railway station in Turgutlu, Turkey and is the only station within the city. TCDD Taşımacılık operates a daily inter-city train from İzmir to Konya and a daily regional train to İzmir to Uşak.

The station was opened on 10 January 1866 as Cassaba railway station and built by the Smyrna Cassaba Railway as part of their railway from Smyrna (modern day İzmir). Cassaba was the railway original terminus and one of Turkey's oldest railway stations. The railway was later extended further east to Karahisar.

References

Railway stations in Manisa Province
Railway stations opened in 1866
Buildings and structures in Manisa Province
Transport in Manisa Province
Turgutlu